The Madonna and Child is the subject of several paintings by Cima da Conegliano:

 Madonna and Child (Cima, Amsterdam)
 Madonna and Child (Cima, Bologna)
 Madonna and Child (Cima, Cardiff)
 Madonna and Child (Cima, Detroit)
 Madonna and Child (Cima, Este)
 Madonna and Child (Cima, Florence)
 Madonna and Child (Cima, Gemona del Friuli)
 Virgin and Child (Cima, London, c. 1496–1499)
 Virgin and Child (Cima, London, c. 1499–1502)
 Virgin and Child (Cima, London, c. 1505)
 Madonna and Child in a Landscape (Cima, Los Angeles)
 Madonna and Child (Cima, Minneapolis)
 Madonna and Child (Cima, Paris)
 Madonna and Child (workshop of Cima, Paris)
 Virgin and Child before a Landscape (Philadelphia)
 Madonna and Child (Cima, private collection)
 Virgin and Child in a Landscape (Cima, Raleigh)
 Madonna and Child (Cima, Saint Petersburg)
 Madonna and Child (Cima, San Francisco)

See also
 Madonna and Child with Saints (disambiguation)
 Madonna and Child (disambiguation)
 Virgin and Child (disambiguation)

 1